Events from the year 1446 in France

Incumbents
 Monarch – Charles VII

Births
 3 May - Margaret of York, English-born woman married to Charles the Bold, Duke of Burgundy (died 1503)
 26 December Charles, Duke of Berry, Nobleman (died 1472)

Deaths
 6 May - Georges de La Trémoille, courtier (born 1382)

References

1440s in France